Wilson Kamavuaka (born 29 March 1990) is a Congolese professional footballer.

Club career
Kamavuaka was born in Düren, Germany.

On 1 February 2015, after being without a club for seven months, Kamavuaka joined Austrian Bundesliga side Sturm Graz. He signed a contract until the end of the 2014–15 season, which includes an extension clause for another two years.

On 9 September 2016, he signed a two-year contract with Panetolikos F.C. of the Super League Greece.

In summer 2020, he moved to 3. Liga club MSV Duisburg. He signed a one-season contract with the option of another season. He left Duisburg at the end of the 2020–21 season.

On 28 March 2022, Kamavuaka signed with HIFK in Finland. His contract with HIFK was terminated on 30 June 2022.

Career statistics

Club

International

Personal life
Fellow professional footballer Richard Sukuta-Pasu is his second cousin.

References

External links

1990 births
Living people
Association football central defenders
Citizens of the Democratic Republic of the Congo through descent
Democratic Republic of the Congo footballers
Democratic Republic of the Congo international footballers
Bundesliga players
2. Bundesliga players
Regionalliga players
Oberliga (football) players
Belgian Pro League players
Austrian Football Bundesliga players
Super League Greece players
I liga players
3. Liga players
TSG 1899 Hoffenheim II players
1. FC Nürnberg players
1. FC Nürnberg II players
SSV Jahn Regensburg players
K.V. Mechelen players
SK Sturm Graz players
Panetolikos F.C. players
SV Darmstadt 98 players
GKS Tychy players
MSV Duisburg players
HIFK Fotboll players
Democratic Republic of the Congo expatriate footballers
Expatriate footballers in Austria
Democratic Republic of the Congo expatriate sportspeople in Austria
Expatriate footballers in Belgium
Democratic Republic of the Congo expatriate sportspeople in Belgium
Expatriate footballers in Greece
Democratic Republic of the Congo expatriate sportspeople in Greece
Expatriate footballers in Poland
Democratic Republic of the Congo expatriate sportspeople in Poland
Expatriate footballers in Finland
Democratic Republic of the Congo expatriate sportspeople in Finland
German sportspeople of Democratic Republic of the Congo descent
People from Düren
Sportspeople from Cologne (region)